The 2021 Dutch Open, also known by its sponsored name Van Mossel Kia Dutch Open, was a professional tennis tournament played on clay courts. It was the second edition of the Challenger tournament which was part of the 2021 ATP Challenger Tour. It took place in Amersfoort, Netherlands between 12 and 18 July 2021.

Singles main draw entrants

Seeds

 1 Rankings are as of 28 June 2021.

Other entrants
The following players received wildcards into the singles main draw:
  Gijs Brouwer
  Ryan Nijboer
  Jelle Sels

The following players received entry into the singles main draw as alternates:
  Thomaz Bellucci
  Johannes Härteis

The following players received entry from the qualifying draw:
  Michael Geerts
  Alexander Maarten Jong
  Johan Nikles
  Deney Wassermann

Champions

Singles

 Tallon Griekspoor def.  Botic van de Zandschulp 6–1, 3–6, 6–1.

Doubles

 Luca Castelnuovo /  Manuel Guinard def.  Sergio Galdós /  Gonçalo Oliveira 0–6, 6–4, [11–9].

References

Dutch Open
2021 in Dutch tennis
July 2021 sports events in the Netherlands
Dutch Open (tennis)